Aprifrontalia is a genus of Asian dwarf spiders that was first described by R. Oi in 1960.  it contains only two species: A. afflata and A. mascula.

See also
 List of Linyphiidae species

References

Araneomorphae genera
Linyphiidae
Spiders of Asia
Spiders of Russia